The Minor Rock Edicts of Ashoka (r.269-233 BCE) are rock inscriptions which form the earliest part of the Edicts of Ashoka, and predate Ashoka's Major Rock Edicts. These are the first edicts in the Indian language of Emperor Ashoka, written in the Brahmi script in the 11th year of his reign. They follow chronologically the Kandahar Bilingual Rock Inscription, in Greek and in Aramaic, written in the 10th year of his reign (260 BCE), which is the first known inscription of Ashoka.

There are several slight variations in the content of these edicts, depending on location, but a common designation is usually used, with Minor Rock Edict N°1 (MRE1) and a Minor Rock Edict N°2 (MRE2), which does not appear alone but always in combination with Edict N°1), the different versions being generally aggregated in most translations. There is also a minor edict No.3, discovered in Bairat, for the Buddhist clergy.

The inscriptions of Ashoka in Greek or Aramaic are sometimes also categorized as "Minor Rock Edicts".

The Minor Pillar Edicts of Ashoka refer to five separate  Edicts inscribed on columns, the Pillars of Ashoka. These edicts are preceded chronologically by the Minor Rock Edicts and may have been made in parallel with the Major Rock Edicts.

Chronology 
The Minor Rock Edicts were written quite early in the reign of Ashoka, from the 11th year of his reign at the earliest (according to his own inscription, "two and a half years after becoming a secular Buddhist", i.e. two and a half years at least after the Kalinga conquest of the eighth year of his reign, which is the starting point for his gradual conversion to Buddhism). The technical quality of the engraving of the inscriptions is generally very poor, and generally very inferior to the pillar edicts dated to the years 26 and 27 of Ashoka's reign.

The Minor Rock Edicts therefore follow the very first inscription of Ashoka, written in year 10 of his reign, the Kandahar Bilingual Rock Inscription established at Chilzina, Kandahar, in the center of Afghanistan. This first inscription was written in Classical Greek and Aramaic exclusively.

The Minor Rock Edicts maybe slightly earlier than the Major Rock Edicts established to propagate the Dharma, from the 12th year of Ashoka's reign. These Ashoka inscriptions are in Indian languages with the exception of the Kandahar Greek Edict of Ashoka inscribed on a limestone stele. It was only later, during the 26th and 27th years of his reign, that Ashoka wrote new edicts, this time on majestic columns, the pillars of Ashoka.

Text of the Minor Rock Edicts
The different variations of edicts on rock 1 and 2 are usually presented in the form of a compilation. There is also a minor edict on Rock No.3, discovered in Bairat only, addressing not the Ashoka officers as the first two edicts, but the Buddhist clergy, with the recommendation to study a very specific list of Buddhist scriptures.

In the Minor Rock Edicts, Ashoka makes explicit mention of his religious affiliation by presenting himself as a "lay disciple" or "disciple of the Buddha" according to the versions, and speaking of his proximity to "the order" (samgha), which is far from the case in most other edicts where he is only promulgating the moral laws of "Dharma".

Association of Ashoka with the title "Devanampriya" ("Beloved-of-the-Gods")

There are slight variations between each of the versions of the Minor Rock Edicts. The Maski version of Minor Rock Edict No.1 was historically especially important in that it confirmed the association of the honorific title "Devanampriya" with Ashoka:

In the Gujarra Minor Rock Edict also, the name of Ashoka is used together with his titles: "Devanampiya Piyadasi Asokaraja".

Pre-existence of pillars
In the Minor Rock Edicts, Ashoka also mentions the duty to inscribe his edicts on the rocks and on the pillars ("wherever there is a pillar or rock"). This has led some authors, especially John Irwin, to think that there were already pillars in India before Ashoka erected them. For John Irwin, examples today of these pillars prior to Ashoka would be the bull pillar of Rampurva, the elephant pillar of Sankissa, and the Allahabad pillar of Ashoka. None of these pillars received the inscription of the Minor Rock Edicts, and only the pillar of Allahabad has inscriptions of Ashoka, which weakens this theory, since, according to the orders of the same of Ashoka, they should have been engraved with his Minor Rock Edicts.

Language of the edicts
Several edicts of Ashoka are known in Greek and Aramaic; by contrast the many minor edicts on rock engraved in southern India in Karnataka use the Prakrit of the North as the language of communication, with the Brahmi script, and not the local Dravidian idiom, which can be interpreted as a kind of intrusion and authoritarianism in respect to the southern territories.

Full texts of the Minor Rock Edicts
Minor Rock Edict No.1
In this Edict, Ashoka describes himself as a Buddhist layman (Upāsaka) /a Buddha-Śaka /a Saka, and also explains he has been getting closer to the Sangha and has become more ardent in the faith.
 

Minor Rock Edict No.2
Only appears in a few places, in conjunction with Minor Edict No.1

Minor Rock Edict No.3
Only appears at Bairat, where it was discovered in front of the Bairat Temple, possibly the oldest free-standing temple in India. The Edict is now located in the Museum of The Asiatic Society, Calcutta, and because of this is sometimes called the "Calcutta-Bairāṭ inscription". Also known as the Bhabru Edict. Ashoka claims "great is my reverence and faith in the Buddha, the Dharma (and) the Samgha", and makes a list of recommended Buddhist scriptures that Buddhist monks as well as the laity should repeatedly study.

Locations 
The minor rock edicts of Ashoka are exclusively inscribed on rock. They are located throughout the Indian subcontinent. Edict N°1 appears alone in Panguraria, Maski, Palkigundu et Gavimath, Bahapur/Srinivaspuri, Bairat, Ahraura, Gujarra, Sasaram, Rajula Mandagiri, and in conjunction with Edict N°2 at Yerragudi, Udegolam, Nittur, Brahmagiri, Siddapur, Jatinga-Rameshwara.

The traditional Minor Rock Edicts (excluding the miscellaneous inscriptions in Aramaic or Greek found in Pakistan and Afghanistan) are located in central and southern India, whereas the Major Rock Edicts were located at the frontiers on Ashoka's territory.

Miscellaneous inscriptions often catalogued in the Minor Rock Edicts
Some Ashoka inscriptions in Greek or Aramaic, or the inscriptions of the Barabar Caves, are difficult to categorize, and are sometimes included in the "Minor Rock Edicts".

This is sometimes also the case with the Kandahar Bilingual Rock Inscription (the designation of "Minor Rock Edict No.4" was proposed), although its nature is quite different from other edicts and it is the oldest of Ashoka's inscriptions (10th year of his reign).

The inscriptions in Aramaic, especially the Aramaic Inscription of Laghman and the Aramaic Inscription of Taxila are also often catalogued among the minor rock edicts, although their character of edict is not very clear, and if the first was inscribed on rock, the second was inscribed on an octagonal marble pillar.

The inscriptions of the Barabar Caves are purely dedicatory, without moral content.

Further reading
 Le Huu Phuoc, Buddhist Architecture, Grafikol 2009 
 Valeri P. Yailenko Les maximes delphiques d'Aï Khanoum et la formation de la doctrine du dharma d'Asoka Dialogues d'histoire ancienne vol.16 n°1, 1990, pp. 239–256

References 

Indian inscriptions
Linguistic history of India
Edicts of Ashoka
Memorials to Ashoka